Richard MacPherson (born Richard McPherson) is an actor from Hawaii, who has guest-starred on several television shows.  He has appeared in episodes of Hawaiian Heat, Magnum, P.I., Fantasy Island and Lost, as well as the feature film Escape from Atlantis.

References

Year of birth missing (living people)
Living people
American male film actors
American male television actors
Male actors from Hawaii